The Fishback School is a historic school building on Butterfield Coach Road in Springdale, Arkansas.  It is a single-story wood-frame structure, with weatherboard siding, a concrete foundation, and a hip roof and a projecting gable-roofed entry section.  The entry section has a deeply pedimented gable front, and a tall paneled friezeboard wraps around the building.  The school was built in 1925, during a period of growth in Springdale due to rise as a local market hub.

The building was listed on the National Register of Historic Places in 1992.

See also
National Register of Historic Places listings in Washington County, Arkansas

References

School buildings on the National Register of Historic Places in Arkansas
Buildings and structures in Springdale, Arkansas
National Register of Historic Places in Washington County, Arkansas
1925 establishments in Arkansas
School buildings completed in 1925